Wilfred Diepeveen (born 18 June 1985) is a Dutch cricketer. A right-handed batsman, Diepeveen began his international career in 2000 with the Netherlands U-15 team, progressing through the U-17s, U-19s and A teams and appearing in several European championships before joining the full squad. He debuted for the Netherlands on 10 June 2010 during the 2009–10 ICC Intercontinental Cup, and top scored with 72 not out in his first innings. He made his One Day International debut in September 2011 against Kenya, making six.

Notes

External links
 

1985 births
Living people
Dutch cricketers
Netherlands One Day International cricketers
Sportspeople from Utrecht (city)